The 1906 Italian Athletics Championships  were held in Milan. it was the 1st edition of the Italian Athletics Championships.

Results

References

External links 
 Italian Athletics Federation

1906 in athletics (track and field)
1906
1906 in Italian sport
Sports competitions in Milan